Coromandel Valley is a semirural south-eastern suburb of Adelaide, South Australia.  It straddles the City of Mitcham and the City of Onkaparinga council areas, with the Sturt River being the boundary between the two council areas.

History 
Coromandel Valley, and its neighbouring suburb, Coromandel East, gain their name from a ship, the Coromandel, which arrived in Holdfast Bay from London in 1837 with 156 English settlers. The ship was in turn named after the Coromandel Coast in India. After the ship reached the shore, on 17 January 1837 some of its sailors deserted, intending to remain behind in South Australia, and took refuge in the hills in the Coromandel Valley region. Appearing after the ship had sailed, they were never prosecuted, owing to the lack of a suitable official.

The Coromandel Valley Primary School, established in 1877, is one of the oldest in South Australia.
Adjacent to the school is the original St John's Anglican Church, built with local stone.
The parish at various times in the last century included the rural areas from Meadows in the South to Belair in the north.
An important business in the early days was Alex Murray & Son's jam and biscuit factory, which closed around 1902.

The (now closed) Coromandel Valley Post Office first opened on 10 July 1850, for a time designated "West Sturt".

Parks and recreation
Frank Smith Park, a reserve of approximately 12 hectares including a wetland
Sturt River Linear Park
Weymouth Recreation Ground

References

External links
City of Mitcham
Blackwood High School
Coromandel Valley Primary School
Anglican Parish of Coromandel Valley

Suburbs of Adelaide